

Results

References

Women's synchronized 10 metre platform
Euro